Ajam is an Arabic word meaning "non-Arab".

Ajam or AJAM may also refer to:

Ajam of Bahrain, an ethnic group in Bahrain
Ajam (band), a British world fusion group 
Ajam (maqam), a musical mode in Arabic, Turkish, and related systems of music
Al Jazeera America (AJAM), an American basic cable and satellite news television channel
 'Ajam of Kuwait

See also
Ajami (disambiguation)